Scott Drummond (born 29 May 1974) is a Scottish professional golfer.

Drummond was born in Shrewsbury, England. He played amateur golf for England but decided to represent Scotland, the country of his father, when he turned professional in 1996.

Professional career
In the early years of his career Drummond struggled to win a regular place on the main European Tour, and spent a good deal of his time on the second tier Challenge Tour. In 2004 he claimed a surprise win in the prestigious Volvo PGA Championship, which catapulted him 340 places, from 435th to 95th in the world rankings, and gave him a five-year exemption on the European Tour. He ended the season in 23rd place on the Order of Merit, and was selected as the Sir Henry Cotton Rookie of the Year. He had a consistent 2005 season, but since then he has struggled to reproduce that form, finishing well outside the top 100 on the Order of Merit each season.

Professional wins (6)

European Tour wins (1)

Challenge Tour wins (2)

Challenge Tour playoff record (1–0)

EuroPro Tour wins (2)
1998 Hawkstone Park
1999 Frilford Heath

Jamega Pro Golf Tour wins (2)

Results in major championships

Note: Drummond never played in the Masters Tournament or the U.S. Open.

CUT = missed the half-way cut
"T" = tied

Results in World Golf Championships

"T" = Tied

Team appearances
Amateur
European Boys' Team Championship (representing England): 1991
Jacques Léglise Trophy (representing Great Britain & Ireland): 1992 (winners)
European Youths' Team Championship (representing England): 1994

Professional
World Cup (representing Scotland): 2004, 2005

See also
2009 European Tour Qualifying School graduates

References

External links

Scottish male golfers
European Tour golfers
1974 births
Living people